Rottengraffty (ロットングラフティー), stylized as ЯOTTENGR∀FFTY, is a Japanese rock band from Kyoto formed in 1999. Their musical style mixes alternative rock, heavy metal, electronica, hip hop and reggae. They have had a top ten album and several top twenty singles on the Oricon charts. Their song, "70cm Shiho no Madobe" (70cm四方の窓辺), was used as the 10th ending theme song for the anime, Dragon Ball Super.

Band Members 
Nobuya Murase (村瀬 展弥) – Vocals
Naoki "N∀OKI" Makizawa (沢直 樹) – Vocals
Kazuomi Nakakita (仲北 和臣) – Guitar/Programming
Yuichi "侑威地 (Yuichi )" Adachi (安達 友一) – Bass
Hiroshi Nakama (中間 弘士) – Drums

Discography

Mini album 
 RADICAL PEACE×RADICAL GENOCIDE – 2001
 GRIND VIBES – 2002
 SYNCHRONICITIZM – 2003

EP 
 Life Is Beautiful – 2015
 Goodbye To Romance – 2021

Album 
 CL∀SSICK – 2004
 EKISAPIKO – 2005
 This World – 2010
 FAMILIARIZE – 2011
 Walk – 2013
 PLAY – 2018

DVD 
 TOUR2010 This World　～KYOTO MUSE 2DAYS～」 – 2010
 SILVER&GOLD – 2012
 Walk... This Way - 2014
 PLAY ALL AROUND JAPAN TOUR 2018 in NIPPONBUDOKAN - 2018

Singles 
 Bou is DEAD – 2001
 Warudakumi~Merry Christmas Mr.Lawrence – 2003
 e for 20/Chemical Ken – 2004
 CHAOS in terminal – 2005
 palm – 2006
 form – 2006
 Mandara – 2006
 Maido Ookini – 2008
 D.A.N.C.E – 2012
 Sekai no Owari – 2014
 So... Start – 2016
 70cm Shiho no Madobe – 2017
 Hallelujah - 2019
 Towa to Kage - 2020
 Goodbye To Romance – 2021

Compilations 
 Silver – 2011
 Gold – 2011
 You Are Rottengraffty - 2020

Tribute Albums 
 Mouse Trap - 2019

References

External links 

Japanese alternative metal musical groups
Japanese alternative rock groups
Japanese electronic rock musical groups
Japanese punk rock groups
Japanese heavy metal musical groups
Japanese nu metal musical groups
1999 establishments in Japan
Musical groups from Kyoto Prefecture
Musical groups established in 1999